The 2021–22 Fordham Rams men's basketball team represented Fordham University during the 2021–22 NCAA Division I men's basketball season. The Rams, led by first-year head coach Kyle Neptune, played their home games at Rose Hill Gymnasium in The Bronx, New York as a member of the Atlantic 10 Conference. They finished the season 16–16, 8–10 in A-10 play to finish in eighth place. They defeated George Washington in the second round of the A-10 tournament before losing to Davidson in the quarterfinals.

On April 20, 2022, following the retirement of Villanova head coach Jay Wright, Kyle Neptune left the school to become the head coach of the Wildcats. On April 26, the school named associate heed coach Keith Urgo the team's new head coach.

Previous season
In a season limited due to the ongoing COVID-19 pandemic, the Rams finished the 2020–21 season 2–12, 2–11 in A-10 play to finish in last place. They lost in the first round to George Washington in the Atlantic 10 tournament.

Offseason

Departures

Incoming transfers

Recruiting classes

2021 recruiting class

2022 recruiting class

Roster

Schedule and results

|-
!colspan=9 style=| Non-conference regular season

|-
!colspan=9 style=| Atlantic 10 regular season

|-
!colspan=9 style=| Atlantic 10 tournament

Source

See also
 2021–22 Fordham Rams women's basketball team

References

Fordham
Fordham Rams men's basketball seasons
Fordham
Fordham